NameSilo LLC is an American Internet domain registrar and web hosting company headquartered in Phoenix, Arizona. It is owned by NameSilo Technologies Corp., which is listed on the Canadian Securities Exchange (an alternative stock exchange for micro-cap and emerging companies). NameSilo is an ICANN-accredited domain name registrar company which provides DNS domains, web hosting, email services, SSL certificates, and other website products.

History 
NameSilo LLC was founded in 2010 by Michael Goldfarb and Michael McCallister in Phoenix, Arizona.

In July 2021, the company reached the 3 million active domains.

In February 2020, NameSilo sold 84.299 Bitcoins of $839K value.

As of December 2019, NameSilo has 3.4 million active domains under management, placing it in the top 15 of registrars around the world.

Acquisition and partnership 
On March 7, 2018, Vancouver based Brisio Innovations Inc. acquired an 81.5% stake of NameSilo LLC. NameSilo had 1.2 million active domains under management at the time. In November, 2018, Brisio Innovations Inc. announced plans to change its name to "NameSilo Technologies Corp".

In 2019, NameSilo acquired NamePal, a domain registrar and web hosting company with its 100% stake.

In Dec 2019, NameSilo partnered with NuSec.

Awards
NamePros' Registrar of the Year 2019

References 

American companies established in 2010
Domain name registrars
Web hosting
Internet properties established in 2010
Companies listed on the Canadian Securities Exchange